Winfried "Winnie" Schäfer (born 10 January 1950) is a German football manager and former player who last managed of Qatari club Al-Khor.

Playing career
Winfried Schäfer played 403 Bundesliga matches and scored 46 goals in the (West) German top-flight.

He won the 1970 Bundesliga title and 1970 DFB-Pokal with two different clubs – because the West German Cup final was played after the 1970 FIFA World Cup and his move from Mönchengladbach to Offenbach.

Coaching career

Karlsruher SC
As a manager, he led Karlsruher SC to the semi-finals of the UEFA Cup in the 1993–94 season.

VfB Stuttgart

Tennis Borussia Berlin

Cameroon national team
In November 2001, Schäfer was appointed head coach of Cameroon. He won the 2002 African Cup of Nations with Cameroon, defeating Senegal 3–2 in a penalty shoot-out after a 0–0 draw in the final.

Al-Ahli
In 2006, he won the UAE national championship with Al-Ahli (Dubai). He worked then from 2007 to 2009 for UAE League side Al-Ain.

FK Baku
On 10 June 2010, Schäfer signed a two-year contract with Azerbaijani club Baku. On 18 January 2011 his contract was ended.

Thailand national team / Muangthong United
 
In late June 2011, Schäfer was hired as Thailand manager on a three-year contract. On 4 June 2013, Schäfer and Football Association of Thailand mutually agreed to cancel the contract. The following day, he became manager of thai club Muangthong United, replacing Serbian Slaviša Jokanović.

Jamaica national team
On 17 July 2013, it was announced that Schäfer will become the new coach of Jamaica, replacing previous manager Theodore Whitmore who resigned from his position following a 2–0 loss to Honduras. Jamaica's first match with Schäfer as manager was a World Cup qualification match against Panama on 7 September 2013 which ended with a 0–0 draw.

In the 2014 Caribbean Cup, Jamaica's first match ended with a 1–1 draw over Martinique. However, the team recorded two-straight wins against Antigua and Barbuda and Haiti to make it to the final. Schäfer led Jamaica to their sixth Caribbean Cup title after beating Trinidad and Tobago 4–3 on penalties in the final.

In June 2015 at the Copa América, Jamaica put in an incredible performance, being drawn in the same group as regional powers Argentina and Uruguay, who both defeated Jamaica by a single goal. Shortly after, on 22 July 2015 Schäfer's team reached the Final of the Gold Cup after beating tournament favourites the United States.

Esteghlal
On 2 October 2017, Schäfer was chosen to become the new manager of Iranian club Esteghlal, following Alireza Mansourian's resignation as team's head coach. The next day, he signed his official contract with Esteghlal until the end of the season.

2017–18 season
 
Upon being appointed, Schäfer re-called Esteghlal's captain Mehdi Rahmati who was banned from joining the team by the previous coach, Alireza Mansourian, as well as asking the management to re-sign Behnam Barzay whose contract wasn't renewed and became a free agent in summer. Schäfer also chose to continue working with Mick McDermott (whom he worked with as fitness coach in Al Ain) as Esteghlal's assistant manager, however they had a conflict later on and McDermott left the club on 30 October. Jiří Saňák and Miguel Coley were announced to replace him as Schäfer's assistant coach.

His first official match as Esteghlal's coach was the 0–0 against Foolad in Azadi Stadium on 13 October. His first victory came against Nassaji Mazandaran in Hazfi Cup, which Esteghlal won the match 2–1. He won his first league match on 31 October beating Naft Talaieh 2–0.

During the winter transfer window, he offloaded players which were not part of his plans for the rest of the season. Hassan Beyt Saeed joined Foolad while Yaghoub Karimi went to Esteghlal Khuzestan. Sajjad Shahbazzadeh joined Qatar SC on a free transfer. In association with Esteghlal vice president Seyed Pendar Toufighi, two new signings were made by Schäfer; free agent's Bojan Najdenov and Mame Thiam arrived at the club.

On 28 December Schäfer's Esteghlal beat Esteghlal Khuzestan 3–0 and became the first team to reach a total of 900 points in all-time Persian Gulf Pro League table. In the 2018 AFC Champions League, Schäfer's team were drawn against Al-Rayyan, Al Ain and Al-Hilal in the competition's group of death. However, they did not lose a game, topping the group with some impressive performances. On 1 March 2018, Schäfer won his first Tehran derby as a manager in a 1–0 victory; this was also his third win against Branko Ivanković, having previously beaten him twice in 2. Bundesliga with Tennis Borussia Berlin when Branko was the manager of Hannover 96 during the 1999–2000 season. On 3 May 2018, Schäfer extended his contract until June 2020. On the same day, Schäfer won his first trophy with Esteghlal, the Hazfi Cup, when his side defeated Khooneh be Khooneh 1–0, with Mame Thiam scoring the only goal. Esteghlal extended their record of 7 Hazfi Cups.

2018–19 season
 
During Schäfer's second season as manager, he saw some of his top players leaving the club, Majid Hosseini moved to Trabzonspor, while Omid Ebrahimi joined Al Ahli, Server Djeparov signed for Zhetysu and Omid Noorafkan moved to Charleroi. Esteghlal signed players such as Morteza Aghakhan, Rouhollah Bagheri, Farshad Mohammadi Mehr, Meysam Teymouri, Ali Karimi and Morteza Tabrizi to replace the departed players and improve the squad depth. He also asked to sign Nigerian striker Alhaji Gero, his compatriot Markus Neumayr as well as Iraq international Humam Tariq.

Schäfer's Esteghlal were eliminated in the quarterfinals of the AFC Champions League after a 5–3 aggregate loss to Al Sadd on 17 September 2018. They were also eliminated from the Hazfi Cup on 1 November, reaching the Round of 16 stage, after a penalty shootout defeat to Saipa after a 2–2 draw. On 29 April 2019, Schäfer was suspended until the end of the season two days after Esteghlal's loss to Padideh in the league and replaced by his assistant Farhad Majidi.

Baniyas
On 6 July 2019, Schäfer was confirmed as the new manager of Emirati side Baniyas, he coached the team until his contract expired with barely any notable records other than getting to the UAE President's Cup semi finals.

Al-Khor
In late January 2021, Schäfer became the head coach of Qatar Stars League club Al-Khor to help them in a difficult situation. Results and performance improved relatively, the team remained in the league after win 3–1 in the play-off match against Al-Shahania. On 11 November 2021, he left Qatar after his contract was terminated.

Managerial statistics

Honours

Player
Borussia Mönchengladbach 	
Bundesliga: 1969–70
UEFA Cup: 1978–79

Kickers Offenbach
DFB-Pokal: 1969–70

Manager
Karlsruher SC
2. Bundesliga runner-up: 1986–87
DFB-Pokal runner-up: 1995–96
UEFA Intertoto Cup: 1996

Cameroon national team
African Cup of Nations: 2002
FIFA Confederations Cup runner-up: 2003

Al-Ahli
UAE Football League: 2005–06

Al-Ain
UAE President's Cup: 2008–09
Etisalat Emirates Cup: 2008–09
UAE Super Cup: 2009

Thailand national team
AFF Championship runner-up: 2012

Jamaica national team
Caribbean Cup: 2014
CONCACAF Gold Cup runner-up: 2015

Esteghlal
Hazfi Cup: 2017–18
Iranian Super Cup runner-up: 2018

Personal life
Schäfer is married, has two children, and has lived with his family for more than 25 years in Ettlingen near Karlsruhe. In 2004 Schäfer was elected with the most votes to the municipal council of Ettlingen. He ran for the newly founded association "For Ettlingen". Because of his frequent work-related stays abroad, he held the mandate but barely. He is known for his passion for football. His son Sascha Oliver works with him as an assistant.

References

External links

 
 
 

1950 births
Living people
People from Mayen
German footballers
Germany B international footballers
Germany under-21 international footballers
Borussia Mönchengladbach players
Karlsruher SC players
Kickers Offenbach players
Bundesliga players
German football managers
2001 FIFA Confederations Cup managers
2002 FIFA World Cup managers
2003 FIFA Confederations Cup managers
Cameroon national football team managers
Tennis Borussia Berlin managers
Karlsruher SC managers
VfB Stuttgart managers
Bundesliga managers
Al Ain FC managers
Esteghlal F.C. managers
Baniyas SC managers
UAE Pro League managers
Expatriate football managers in the United Arab Emirates
Thailand national football team managers
Jamaica national football team managers
Expatriate football managers in Jamaica
2015 Copa América managers
Copa América Centenario managers
2004 African Cup of Nations managers
2002 African Cup of Nations managers
Association football midfielders
UEFA Cup winning players
2015 CONCACAF Gold Cup managers
Footballers from Rhineland-Palatinate
Expatriate football managers in Iran
Persian Gulf Pro League managers
West German footballers
West German football managers
German expatriate sportspeople in Thailand
German expatriate sportspeople in the United Arab Emirates
German expatriate sportspeople in Iran
German expatriate sportspeople in Jamaica
German expatriate sportspeople in Cameroon
German expatriate sportspeople in Azerbaijan
German expatriate sportspeople in Qatar